This page lists board and card games, wargames, miniatures games, and tabletop role-playing games published in 2005.  For video games, see 2005 in video gaming.

Games released or invented in 2005

Game awards given in 2005
Game of the Year and Gamers Choice for Best Miniatures (Origins Awards): WARMACHINE Apotheosis
 Games: Australia

Deaths

See also
 2005 in video gaming

Games
Games by year